Paul Finn may refer to:

 Paul Finn (hurler), Irish hurler
 Paul Finn (judge), Australian federal court judge

See also
 Paul Anthony Finn, Irish singer-songwriter